Hemerodromiinae are a worldwide group of predatory flies with raptorial forelegs.

Genera
Afrodromia Smith, 1969
Antipodromia Plant, 2011
Chelifera Macquart, 1823
Chelipoda Macquart, 1823
Chelipodozus Collin, 1933
Cladodromia Bezzi, 1905
Colabris Melander, 1928
Doliodromia Collin, 1928
Drymodromia Bezzi, 1914
Dryodromya Rondani, 1856
Hemerodromia Meigen, 1822
Metachela Coquillett, 1903
Monodromia Collin, 1928
Neoplasta Coquillett, 1895
Phyllodromia Zetterstedt, 1837
Ptilophyllodromia Bezzi, 1904

References

External links 
 
 

Asilomorpha subfamilies
Empididae